Le Haillan is a commune in the Gironde department in south-western France.

It is a suburb of the city of Bordeaux, and is adjacent to it on the northwest side.

Population

Sister cities
 Colindres, Spain
 Kalampaka, Greece
 Enderby, England

See also
Communes of the Gironde department

References

Communes of Gironde